The first Battle of Raszyn was fought on 19 April 1809 between armies of the Austrian Empire under Archduke Ferdinand Karl Joseph of Austria-Este and the Duchy of Warsaw under Józef Antoni Poniatowski, as part of the War of the Fifth Coalition in the Napoleonic Wars. The battle was not decisive, but it did result in the Austrians obtaining their goal by capturing the Polish capital Warsaw.

Battle
The battlefield's terrain is dominated by several villages and by the river Utrata, which during the April thaw is usually unfordable. The only way to cross the river is at the ponds of Raszyn, Dawidy or Michalowice, which were all under Polish control.

After a preparatory cannonade starting at 14.00, the Austrian infantry attacked the Polish screening forces around 15.00. The Poles gradually yielded terrain. Austrian attempts to outflank the Polish position near Jaworowo were unsuccessful. After the village of Falenty was captured at 16.00 Poniatowski launched a counterattack which evicted the Austrians from the town and re-established the Polish line. Around 17.00 a combined attack was launched against Raszyn. Repulsed by the Saxon units, the Austrians called up reinforcements and took the town around 19.00 but were unable to progress beyond the last houses of the village. The Poles again counterattacked at 21.00 and drove the Austrians from Raszyn but were unable to recapture the causeway. Fighting progressed until 22.00 when the Poles evacuated the battlefield.

Aftermath
After the Austrian army withdrew to the other side of the swamps, prince Józef Poniatowski ordered his forces to withdraw towards Warsaw. However, since the city fortifications were in a very bad shape and the Saxon expeditionary force withdrew towards their homeland, Poniatowski decided to leave Warsaw undefended and withdraw to several fortresses located nearby (most notably to Modlin Fortress and Serock). The capital was seized on 23 April, but it was a Pyrrhic victory since the Austrian commander diverted most of his forces there at the expense of other fronts. In the following weeks Greater Poland was defended by the Corps of General Henryk Dąbrowski and the Polish cavalry seized Lwów. Finally, Poniatowski left only a small force near Warsaw to prevent the Austrians from leaving it and moved the rest of his forces southwards, which led to capturing the city of Kraków.

On 14 October 1809 the Treaty of Schönbrunn was signed between Austria and France. According to it, Austria lost approximately 50,000 square kilometres of land inhabited by over 1,900,000 people. The territories annexed by the Duchy of Warsaw included the lands of Zamość and Kraków as well as 50% of income of the Wieliczka salt mines.

Afterwards, Poniatowski was presented with the grand-aigle de la Légion d'honneur, a saber of honor, and a lancer's shako.

The Battle of Raszyn is commemorated on the Tomb of the Unknown Soldier, Warsaw, with the inscription "RASZYN 19 IV 1809".

See also
 Cyprian Godebski

Notes

References

External links 
 The Battle of Raszyn, 1809 

 

Conflicts in 1809
Battles of the War of the Fifth Coalition
Battles involving Austria
Battles involving Poland
1809 in the Austrian Empire
History of Warsaw
April 1809 events